Finckenstein Palace (German: Schloss Finckenstein) was a baroque palace, designed by the architect John von Collas between 1716 and 1720 in the former West Prussia, about 25 mi. (40 km) south of Elbląg in present-day Susz, Poland. It was built by Prussian Field Marshal, Marquess, and Count Albrecht Konrad Reinhold Finck von Finckenstein and remained in the possession of the Finck von Finckenstein family until 1782. After that the Counts Dohna-Schlobitten lived in it until 1945. Red Army soldiers set the palace on fire January 22, 1945, during their conquest of East Prussia. The ruins are still visible.

The palace became famous in 1807, when Napoleon made it his residence from April through June of that year. When he saw the palace for the first time, he said: Enfin un chateau ("Finally, a castle"). The Treaty of Finckenstein between France and Persia was signed here. Here, Napoleon met his mistress Maria Walewska, with whom he lived in the palace. The Hollywood movie Conquest depicted the palace with Greta Garbo and Charles Boyer but was actually filmed in  
Monterey, California. https://www.tcm.com/tcmdb/title/97/conquest#film-details

See also
Kamieniec (Warmian-Masurian Voivodeship)

References

External links

Google Books search
www.rosenberg-wpr.de
History of Finckenstein showing contemporary pictures

Baroque palaces
Iława County
Buildings and structures in Warmian-Masurian Voivodeship
Buildings and structures in Poland destroyed during World War II
Former palaces in Poland